The Carlos Palanca Memorial Awards for Literature winners in the year 1951 (rank, title of winning entry, name of author). Open only in English and Tagalog Short story, these are the first recipient winners of the Awards.


English division
Short story
First prize: "Clay" by Juan T. Gatbonton
Second prize: "The Flowers of May" by Francisco Arcellana
Third prize: "The Black Monkey" by Edith L. Tiempo

Filipino (Tagalog) division
Short story in Filipino
First prize: "Kuwento ni Mabuti" by Genoveva Edroza Matute
Second prize: "Mabangis na Kamay, Maamong Kamay" by Pedro S. Dandan
Third prize: "Planeta, Buwan at mga Bituin" by Elpidio P. Kapulong

References
 

Palanca Awards
1951 literary awards